Prismatolaimidae is a family of nematodes belonging to the order Enoplida.

Genera:
 Cyathonchus Cobb, 1933
 Limonchulus Andrássy, 1963
 Odontolaimus Micoletzky, 1922
 Onchulus Cobb, 1920
 Paronchulus Altherr, 1972
 Prismatolaimus de Man, 1880
 Pseudonchulus
 Stenonchulus W.Schneider, 1940

References

Nematode families